Dichromanthus is a genus of flowering plants from the orchid family, Orchidaceae. As currently delimited, it is monophyletic and includes four species:

 Dichromanthus aurantiacus (Lex.) Salazar & Soto Arenas - much of Mexico, south to Honduras
 Dichromanthus cinnabarinus (Lex.) Garay - from Texas to Guatemala
 Dichromanthus michuacanus (Lex.) Salazar & Soto Arenas - from Texas and Arizona south to Honduras
 Dichromanthus yucundaa  Salazar & García-Mend. - Oaxaca

The genus ranges from the southwestern United States (Texas and Arizona) through most Mexican mountain ranges to Guatemala, El Salvador and Honduras. Except for the narrow endemic D. yucundaa, restricted to the Mexican state of Oaxaca, all other species are widespread and locally common.

See also 
 List of Orchidaceae genera

References 

  (2003) Genera Orchidacearum 3: 197 ff. Oxford University Press.
  2003. Subtribe Spiranthinae. Pages 164–278 in A. M. Pridgeon, P. J. Cribb, M. W. Chase and F. N. Rasmussen [eds.]. Genera Orchidacearum vol. 3: Orchidoideae part 2, Vanilloideae. Oxford University Press, Oxford, U.K.
  2005. Handbuch der Orchideen-Namen. Dictionary of Orchid Names. Dizionario dei nomi delle orchidee. Ulmer, Stuttgart.
 . 2009. A new species of Dichromanthus (Orchidaceae, Spiranthinae) from Oaxaca, Mexico. Revista Mexicana de Biodiversidad 80 (1): 23–28.

External links 

Cranichideae genera
Spiranthinae